Craig Avery Swoope, Sr. (born February 3, 1964), is a former professional American football player who played collegiately for the University of Illinois, and in 3 NFL seasons from 1986 to 1988 for the Tampa Bay Buccaneers and Indianapolis Colts. He was a second-team All-American and four-time All-Big Ten selection for the Illini, and as of 2009 is third all-time on Illinois' career interceptions list. 

Swoope began his rookie season as the Buccaneers' starter at strong safety, and was named to the Football Digest all-rookie team. Injuries limited his playing time late in the season, and he was moved to free safety the next year. He was placed on the injured reserve list without playing a game the next season, and was later waived from the injured reserve list. Signed by the Colts, he earned the starting job in the 1988 preseason, but dislocated an elbow in the season opener and missed four weeks of play. He lost his starting job on returning to the roster, but regained it after an injury to Freddie Robinson. Swoope recorded a career-high 11 tackles in the game in which Robinson was injured. Swoope's reckless, aggressive playing style is considered to have been responsible for the injuries that shortened his playing career. He was cut by the Colts at the end of the 1989 preseason. His number 20 jersey was retired together with Ryan McNeil's number 6 jersey by Fort Pierce Westwood High School in a 2008 ceremony.

References

External links
  YouTube video of Swoope against Michigan
  YouTube video with big hit of Swoope on Al Toon

1964 births
Living people
Tampa Bay Buccaneers players
Indianapolis Colts players
American football safeties
Illinois Fighting Illini football players
Players of American football from Florida
People from Fort Pierce, Florida